Jeffrey Clyde Hayes (born August 19, 1959) is a former American football punter in the National Football League (NFL) for the Washington Redskins, Cincinnati Bengals, and the Miami Dolphins.  He played in Super Bowl XVII and XVIII for the Washington Redskins.  Hayes played college football at the University of North Carolina at Chapel Hill.

Hayes made 274 punts in the NFL, with a longest punt of 59 yards in 1984 game, a total of 10,471 yards with a career average of 38.2 yards per punt. He scored one touchdown, running for a 61 yard touchdown while playing for the Bengals against the Pittsburgh Steelers via a fake punt where he evaded two tackles. While playing for Washington, he made four rushing attempts that included a 24 yard run in 1984 following a 48 yard run in 1983. He finished his career with 168 rushing yards from 7 attempts. His 61 yard run is the longest touchdown run for a kicker or punter, and was the longest run for those positions until Reggie Hodges's 68 yard, non-touchdown run in a 2010 game against the New Orleans Saints.

References

1959 births
Living people
People from Elkin, North Carolina
American football punters
North Carolina Tar Heels football players
Washington Redskins players
Cincinnati Bengals players
Miami Dolphins players